The  2016 Rising Phoenix World Championships was an IFBB Wings of Strength female professional bodybuilding competition and held in conjunction with the IFBB Arizona Pro. It was held on September 10, 2016 at the Talking Stick Resort in Scottsdale, Arizona.

Call outs

Prejudging
1st - Margaret Martin, Sheila Bleck, Alina Popa, Helle Trevino
2nd - Helle Trevino, Yaxeni Oriquen-Garcia, Kim Buck, Lisa Cross, Irene Andersen
3rd - Lisa Cross, Irene Andersen, Nancy Clark, Maria Bello, Angela Rayburn
4th - Jacqueline Fuchs, Lora Ottenad, Amanda Aivaliotis, Laura Carolan
5th - Isabelle Turell, Lora Ottenad, Amanda Aivaliotis, Laura Carolan, Alana Shipp
6th - Margaret Martin, Sheila Bleck, Alina Popa, Helle Trevino

Prize money
1st - $50,000 + $65,000 Jeep

Results

Overall results
1st - Margaret Martin
2nd - Sheila Bleck
3rd - Alina Popa
4th - Helle Trevino
5th - Yaxeni Oriquen-Garcia
6th - Kim Buck
7th - Lisa Cross
8th - Irene Andersen
9th - Nancy Clark
10th - Maria Bello
11th - Angela Rayburn
12th - Jacqueline Fuchs
13th - Isabelle Turell
14th - Silvia Matta
15th - Lora Ottenad
16th - Amanda Aivaliotis
16th - Laura Carolan
16th - Alana Shipp

Comparison to previous Rising Phoenix World Championships results:

Same - Margaret Martin
-2 - Helle Trevino
-1 - Yaxeni Oriquen-Garcia
+2 - Lisa Cross
+6 - Irene Andersen
-2 - Maria Bello
-6 - Isabelle Turtle
-11 - Alana Shipp

Scorecard

Best poser winner
Winner - Sheila Bleck

Comparison to previous Rising Phoenix World Championships results:

+1 - Sheila Bleck
-1 - Margaret Martin

2016 Rising Phoenix World Championships Qualified

Points standings

 In the event of a tie, the competitor with the best top five contest placings will be awarded the qualification. If both competitors have the same contest placings, than both will qualify for the Rising Phoenix World Championships.

Attended
2nd Rising Phoenix World Championships attended - Margaret Martin, Helle Trevino, Yaxeni Oriquen-Garcia, Lisa Cross, Irene Andersen, Maria Bello, Isabelle Turell, and Alana Shipp
1st Rising Phoenix World Championships attended - Sheila Bleck, Alina Popa, Kim Buck, Nancy Clark, Angela Rayburn, Jacqueline Fuchs, Lora Ottenad, Amanda Aivaliotis, Laura Carolan, and Silvia Matta
Previous year Olympia attendees who did not attend - Debi Laszewski, Aleesha Young, Christine Envall, Shawna Strong, Virginia Sanchez, Monique Jones, and Gillian Kovack

Notable events
This was Margaret Martin's 2nd Ms Rising Phoenix overall award win.
This was Sheila Bleck's 1st Ms Rising Phoenix best poser award win.
On September 25, 2015, in an interview with Dave Palumbo, Kyle announced she will be coming out of retirement to compete at the 2016 Wings of Strength Rising Phoenix World Championships. Although Iris Kyle stated she wanted to compete at the 2016 Wings of Strength Rising Phoenix World Championships, the IFBB told her that she needed to either win the 2015 Puerto Rico Pro, 2015 Toronto Pro Supershow, the 2015 Omaha Pro, the 2016 Chicago Pro, the 2016 Lenda Murray Pro AM, and the 2016 PBW Tampa Pro, or be one of the top 7 IFBB female bodybuilders to accumulative points implementing the IFBB Tier 4 point system. Iris was angered at the IFBB, stating that she was entitled to compete for the fact she is the most successful bodybuilder, male or female, ever. Iris said that she was offered to do some work with them that she doesn't "agree with", but declined the offer. While the IFBB did later allow her a special invite to the 2016 Wings of Strength Rising Phoenix World Championships, she declined to compete, instead focusing on training her boyfriend, Hidetada Yamagishi, for the 2017 Arnold Classic Men's Physique and focusing on their business venture.
Debi Laszewski, Bonnie Switzer-Pappas, and Catherine LeFrançois qualified but did not attend the 2016 Rising Phoenix World Championships.

See also
2016 Mr. Olympia
2015 Rising Phoenix World Championships

References

Rising Phoenix
Rising Phoenix
Rising Phoenix
Female professional bodybuilding competitions